Frederick L.  Thomas (born September 11, 1973) is former American football cornerback in the National Football League. He was drafted by the Seattle Seahawks in the second round of the 1996 NFL Draft. He played college football at University of Tennessee at Martin.

Thomas also played for the New Orleans Saints.

College career
Thomas originally played college football for Northwest Mississippi Community College during the 1992-1993 seasons. He then transferred to Ole Miss, again transferred to the University of Tennessee at Martin, and again transferred to the Mississippi Valley State.

Professional career

Seattle Seahawks
Thomas played for the Seattle Seahawks from 1996 to 1999.

New Orleans Saints
Thomas signed with the New Orleans Saints before the 2000 season. He played for them until 2007. He finished his Saints career with 13 interceptions and 5 sacks.  His best seasons came in 2002 and 2003.  In 2002, he recorded 1 Sack, 5 INT, 14 PD, and 91 tackles.  In 2003, he recorded 1 Sack, 4 INT, 22 PD, and 85 Tackles.

1973 births
Living people
People from Bruce, Mississippi
Players of American football from Mississippi
American football cornerbacks
Northwest Mississippi Rangers football players
Ole Miss Rebels football players
UT Martin Skyhawks football players
Seattle Seahawks players
New Orleans Saints players
Ed Block Courage Award recipients